The fourteenth series of British reality television series The Apprentice (UK) was broadcast in the UK on BBC One, from 3 October to 16 December 2018. This series saw a number of subtle changes being made by the production staff to keep the programme fresh, including the candidates going abroad to conduct their first task, and team names not being created until the start of the third task. Alongside the standard twelve episodes, the series was preceded by the mini online episode "Meet the Candidates" on 25 September, with two specials aired alongside the series – "The Final Five" on 11 December, and "Why I Fired Them" on 13 December.

One other change made for the fourteenth series saw sixteen candidates taking part, returning to the number of applicants production staff finalised upon prior to production starting on the tenth series, with Sian Gabbidon becoming the overall winner.	Excluding the specials, the series averaged around 7.32 million viewers during its broadcast.

Series overview 
Applications for the fourteenth series began in late November 2017, towards the end of the thirteenth series, with applicants assessed and interviewed by production staff between January and February 2018. Filming took place during Spring to early Summer that year, once the final line-up of participants had been finalised, with final editing completed before the programme's premiere episode was broadcast in mid-Autumn. For this series, the production staff made changes to the programme to keep it fresh on British television, by having only sixteen candidates involved in the series, as it had been prior to the tenth series. Other minor changes included teams not taking on names until they consisted of mixed genders, and the layout of the first episode being conducted abroad and focused on the bargain hunting-styled task that usually is conducted later in the contest.

Team names were decided on the third episode, with Typhoon and Collaborative chosen before teams began their next task. Although a major political event delayed the broadcast of an episode and affected its sister show You're Fired, much of the series received no disruptions in its broadcast schedule. Of those who took part, Sian Gabbidon would become the eventual winner, going on to use her prize to set up production of an affordable luxury range of swimwear.

Candidates

Performance chart

Key:
 The candidate won this series of The Apprentice.
 The candidate was the runner-up.
 The candidate won as project manager on his/her team, for this task.
 The candidate lost as project manager on his/her team, for this task.
 The candidate was on the winning team for this task / they passed the Interviews stage.
 The candidate was on the losing team for this task.
 The candidate was brought to the final boardroom for this task.
 The candidate was fired in this task.
 The candidate lost as project manager for this task and was fired.

Episodes

Ratings
Official episode viewing figures are from BARB and includes viewers on all devices.

References

External links
Official site BBC

14
2018 British television seasons